Ages may refer to:
Advanced glycation end-products, known as AGEs
Ages, Kentucky, census-designated place, United States 
Ages (album)  by German electronic musician Edgar Froese
The geologic time scale, a system of chronological measurement that relates stratigraphy to time
Arnold Ages (1935-2020), Canadian scholar, writer, and journalist

See also
Age (disambiguation)